= Internally displaced persons in Haiti =

Haiti has a large population of Internally displaced persons. The International Organization for Migration estimates that more than a million are internally displaced in Haiti as of January 2025, representing a threefold increase in displacement within a year.
